is a retired Japanese professional shogi player, ranked 5-dan.

References

External links
ShogiHub: Professional Player Info · Nakao, Toshiyuki

Japanese shogi players
Living people
Retired professional shogi players
Professional shogi players from Shizuoka Prefecture
1974 births